Vladimir Konstantinovich Troshin (15 May 1926 – 25 February 2008) was a Soviet and Russian film and theater actor and singer.

In 1951, at the age of 25, for his portrayal of a rural inventor in the play Second Love at the Moscow Art Theater, he was awarded the Stalin Prize (2nd degree). Troshin was the original performer of the song "Moscow Nights" that in 1957 brought him fame all over the Soviet Union.

Troshin was made a People's Artist of the RSFSR in 1985. He also was made a Merited Artist of the Mari El. He was awarded the Order of Honour and Order of Friendship.

Selected songs
 
 Moscow Nights
 Roads
 
 Zemlyanka

Partial discography
 1973 — Vladimir Troshin (LP, «Melodiya» Д 035117-18)
 1979 — Pesni iz kinofil'mov (LP, «Melodiya» С60 12823-4)
 2002 — Luchshiye pesni raznykh let (CD, «Zvezdy kotoriye ne gasnyt» series)
 2006 — Zolotaya kollektsiya retro (2CD, «Bomba Music» BoMB 033—219/220)

Partial filmography

Oni byli pervymi (1956) - Epizod (uncredited)
It Happened in Penkovo (1958)
Na grafskikh razvalinakh (1958)
Oleko Dundich (1958) - Voroshilov
Den pervyy (1958)
Chelovek s planety Zemlya (1959)
Zolotoy eshelon (1959) - Smotritel khranilishcha tsennostey
Hussar Ballad (1962) - Guerilla
Bolshie i malenkie (1963)
The Big Ore (1964) - Driver
Tatyanin den (1968) - Samsonov's Friend
The Little Mermaid (1968, Short) - (voice)
Krakh (1969) - Churchill
Vizit v Kovalyovku (1980)
The Old New Year (1981)
Battle of Moscow (1985) - Kliment Yefremovich Voroshilov
Poshchyochina, kotoroy ne bylo (1987)
How Dark the Nights Are on the Black Sea (1989) - Actor
Iz zhizni Fyodora Kuzkina (1989)
Stalingrad (1990) - Kliment Voroshilov
Entrance to the Labyrinth (1990, TV Mini-Series)
How Dark the Nights Are on the Black Sea (1990)
Wolfhound (1991)
Volkodav (1992)
The Russian Singer (1993) - General Vlasov
Serye volki (1993) - N.V. Podgornyj
Dolgoe proshchanie (2004) - Actor (final film role)

References

External links 
 
 

1926 births
2008 deaths
People from Sverdlovsk Oblast
Soviet male actors
Russian male actors
Soviet male singers
20th-century Russian male singers
20th-century Russian singers
20th-century Russian male actors
21st-century Russian male actors
Stalin Prize winners
Honored Artists of the RSFSR
People's Artists of the RSFSR
Moscow Art Theatre School alumni
Burials in Troyekurovskoye Cemetery